The Politechnika Warszawska PW-2, also called the PW-2 Gapa,  is a Polish lightweight high-wing, strut-braced single-seat, glider that was designed and built at the Warsaw University of Technology and also produced by DWLKK in the early 1990s. Total number of 19 gliders were built, including variant PW-2D bis.

Design and development
The PW-2 was designed as a lightweight glider of modest performance with an open cockpit. The aircraft was intended to be produced as both a completed aircraft and as a kit for amateur construction.

The aircraft is made from composite material, with its control surfaces covered in doped aircraft fabric covering. Its  span wing employs an American-designed NACA 4415 airfoil. The maximum glide ratio is 16:1 at

Operational history
In August 2011 five PW-2Ds were registered in the United States with the Federal Aviation Administration. All were in the Experimental - Exhibition/Racing category and all produced in 1992 or 1993.

Specifications (PW-2D)

See also

References

External links
NACA 4415 airfoil
Photo of PW-2D
Photo of PW-2D

1990s Polish sailplanes
High-wing aircraft
Aircraft first flown in 1985